Robert de Valognes (died 1184), Lord of Benington, was an English noble.

Life
Valognes was the second-eldest son of Roger de Valognes of Benington and Agnes, a daughter of John fitzRichard. After the death without issue of his elder brother Peter, he inherited Benington in Hertfordshire. He confirmed the charters of his father and brother to Binham Priory. In 1177, King Henry II of England ordered that the stone castle at Benington, constructed by his father Roger during the Anarchy, be demolished. Robert died in 1184.

Marriage and issue
Robert married Hawise, whose parentage is unclear and had one daughter Gunnora de Valognes, who married, firstly, Durand de Osteilli and, secondly, Robert Fitzwalter, and had issue.

References
Crawford, George. The Lives and Characters, of the Officers of the Crown, and of the State in Scotland: From the Beginning of the Reign of King David I. to the Union of the Two Kingdoms. Collected from Original Charters, Chartularies, Authentick Records, and the Most Approved Histories. Volume 1. Robert Fleming, 1726.

1180s deaths
Year of birth unknown
People from Benington, Hertfordshire
Robert